Aderemi Aaron-Anthony Atayero (born October 26, 1969 in Ikeja) is a Nigerian engineer who served as the 4th substantive vice chancellor of Covenant University, Nigeria. He previously served as the first academic deputy vice-chancellor, Coordinator School of Engineering, and twice as head of department of Electrical and Information Engineering of Covenant University.

Atayero is a senior research fellow of the International Association of Research Scholars and Administrators, and a fellow of the Science Association of Nigeria (FSAN).

Education and career 
Atayero got his first degree a Bachelor of Science in radio engineering, graduating summa cum laude in 1992 from Moscow Institute of Technology (MIT). In 1994, he proceeded for his masters in satellite communication systems. He studied in Moscow State Technical University of Civil Aviation (MSTUCA) where he earned his PhD during the year 2000.

Professor Atayero is the team lead of the Covenant University Smart City (SmartCU) Project, as well as the head of Covenant University IoT-Enabled Smart & Connected Communities Research Cluster.

He got his first appreciation, Russian Government stipend as a student during the years 1988 to 1994. He then was given a scholarship by the Federal Government of Nigeria Scholarship: Bureau for External Aide, in the years 1988 to 1994. In 2005, he was awarded a Grant for FPGA and VHDL Workshop by the International Center for Theoretical Physics (Trieste, Italy), Kumasi Ghana.

Early life and family 
Atayero Aderemi Aaron-Anthony was born on October 26, 1969 in Ikeja, Lagos State to Prince and Mrs. Atayero of the royal Atayero family in Ijeshaland, Osun State, Nigeria. He is from Ilesa West Local Government Area. Born to a mobile public servant father who served as a Peace Officer and a medical practitioner mother, Atayero was always on the move from one part of Nigeria to the other. He had his primary education at the St. Agnes Primary School, Ikeja, Lagos; but as his father's companion, he went to three different schools for his secondary education. These were Ila Grammar School, Ila Oragun (in the old Oyo State, now in Osun State), Urban Day Secondary School, Eleyele, Ibadan, Oyo State and St. Joseph Secondary School, Agege, Lagos: for his Forms 1 and 2, Form 3 and Forms 4 and 5, respectively.

Atayero earned an early credit in life when in 1986, he had the best West African Examinations Council (WAEC) results in the entire Agege-Alimosho Local Government Area of Lagos State. This feat was no doubt instrumental in the double Nigerian-Russian governments’ scholarships he earned to pursue higher (university) education abroad.

Atayero is married to a Russian wife, Olga, with whom he has three sons: Remi, Femi and Fela Atayero.

References

External links 
 Atayero's PhD thesis 

Living people
Nigerian engineers
Nigerian academic administrators
Academic staff of Covenant University
1969 births